Nurul Maulidi (born November 20, 1985) is an Indonesian footballer who currently plays for Arema FC in the Indonesia Super League.

References

External links

1985 births
Association football defenders
Living people
Indonesian footballers
Liga 1 (Indonesia) players
Arema F.C. players
Indonesian Premier Division players
Persekam Metro players